Semecarpus nigroviridis is a species of plant in the family Anacardiaceae. Its native range includes Bangladesh, Sri Lanka and Borneo.

References

nigroviridis
Flora of Bangladesh
Flora of Borneo
Flora of Sri Lanka
Vulnerable plants
Taxonomy articles created by Polbot